Acacia tayloriana is a shrub of the genus Acacia and the subgenus Pulchellae that is endemic to a small area of south western Australia

Description
The prostrate evergreen shrub and has hairy branchlets with oblong to elliptic stipules. It blooms in January and produces cream-white flowers.

Taxonomy
the species was first formally described by the botanist Ferdinand von Mueller as a part of the work Definitions of some new Australian plants as published in Southern Science Record. It was reclassified as Racosperma taylorianum by Leslie Pedley in 2003 then transferred back to genus Acacia in 2006.
It is closely related to Acacia preissiana.

Distribution
It is native to an area in the South West region of Western Australia where it is found in damp  locations growing in clay-loam or sandy lateritic soils. It has a limited range around the Blackwood River to the north east of Augusta as a part of Eucalyptus marginata forest communities.

Cultivation
The shrub is suitable for planting in suits cottage, bush and mediterranean garden designs as a border, groundcover, spillover or in hanging baskets. It is fast growing, attracts native animals and is drought tolerant and copes with high wind and a light frost. It prefers a sunny position and damp or dry well drained soils.

See also
 List of Acacia species

References

tayloriana
Acacias of Western Australia
Taxa named by Ferdinand von Mueller
Plants described in 1882